Radio Dream is the second album from Sacramento, California rocker Roger Voudouris.  Released in 1979, this album became a major breakthrough for the singer-songwriter/guitarist.  Whereas his self-titled previous album had more hints of progressive rock, Radio Dream found Voudouris simplifying his approach slightly, collaborating with producer Michael Omartian and channeling more of an accessible "pop" sensibility.  The lead-off track, "Get Used to It" became a big hit on the US pop charts, just missing the Top 20. The tune would become Voudouris' only charting single.  The rest of the album features a combination of disco-infused hard rock and mellow ballads, finishing with a slight nod toward his progressive rock past with "Reprise."

The album peaked at No. 171 on the album charts, and it remains his most successful album.

Track listing
 "Get Used to It" (Michael Omartian, Roger Voudouris) (3:00)
 "Just What It Takes" (M. Omartian, Voudouris) (3:26)
 "Does Our Love (Depend on the Night)" (Stormie Omartian, Michael Omartian, Voudouris) (3:11)
 "We Can't Stay Like This Forever" (Voudouris) (3:11)
 "Radio Dream" (M. Omartian, Voudouris) (3:37)
 "Anything from Anyone" (Voudouris, M. Omartian) (3:45)
 "We Only Dance 'Cause We Have To" (M. Omartian, Voudouris) (4:02)
 "The Next Time Around" (Voudouris) (3:18)
 "Reprise" (M. Omartian, Voudouris) (2:25)

Charts

Personnel
Roger Voudouris: Lead vocals, Lead guitar, Electric and Acoustic guitars
Michael Omartian: Keyboards, Percussion, Background vocals
Leland Sklar: Bass, Piccolo bass
David Kemper: Drums, Percussion

Additional Musicians
Jay Graydon: Rhythm guitar on "Just What It Takes"; Acoustic guitar on "Does Our Love (Depend on the Night)" and "Anything from Anyone"
Randy Brecker: Flugelhorn solo on "Does Our Love (Depend on the Night)"; Trumpet on "We Only Dance 'Cause We Have To"
Michael Brecker: Soprano sax on "Radio Dream"; Tenor sax on "We Only Dance 'Cause We Have To"
Stormie Omartian, Myrna Matthews, and Marti McCall: Additional Background vocals on "Does Our Love (Depend on the Night)" and "We Only Dance 'Cause We Have To"

References

1979 albums
Roger Voudouris albums
Warner Records albums
Albums produced by Michael Omartian